"This Is Your Life" is a song by the alternative rock band Switchfoot, and their third single.  "This Is Your Life" first appeared on the group's 2003 album The Beautiful Letdown and peaked at #30 on the US Modern Rock charts. The single also hit the U.S. top 40, peaking at No. 31.

Of the three mainstream radio singles released from The Beautiful Letdown, this song was the least successful on the charts.

Composition
"This Is Your Life" is an alternative rock song that lasts for a duration of four minutes and eighteen seconds. According to the sheet music published at Musicnotes.com by Capitol CMG, it is written in the time signature of common time, with a steady, moderately slow tempo of 124 beats per minute. "This Is Your Life" is composed in the key of C sharp minor (Cm), while Jon Foreman's vocal range spans two octaves and five notes, from a low of B3 to a high of G5. The song has a basic sequence of Cm–A–B during the introduction, alternates between the chords of Cm and Asus2 in the verses and outro, changes to E–Bsus4–Asus2 at its chorus and follows Cm–Asus2–Bsus4–Asus2–Bsus4–Asus2 during the interludes as its chord progression.

Chart positions

In the media
The song was featured on the season 2 finale of science fiction TV show The 4400, as well as in nineteenth episode Blank of season four of Smallville.
It also was featured on the season 7 Charmed episode "Charmageddon".

Live
In concert this song is played longer than the studio version, with a more psychedelic arrangement, in contrast to the electronica-tinged studio version.  The concert version prominently features Jon Foreman screaming into the resonating chamber of his guitar, which distorts the screams to an eerie effect.  During the Nothing Is Sound Tour "This is Your Life" often segued directly into "Happy Is a Yuppie Word".  This combination was also played during a few performances of the Oh! Gravity. Spring Tour, one of which was notably captured on the band's official bootleg for the 21 February 2007 show in Calgary.

References

External links
Jon Foreman's comments

2003 songs
2004 singles
Switchfoot songs
Songs written by Jon Foreman
Columbia Records singles
Sony BMG singles
Song recordings produced by John Fields (record producer)